Liberal Nationalism is a 1993 book of political theory by Yael Tamir that presents a liberal argument in support of national particularism.   Liberal nationalism is an argument that nationalism can work under liberal principles.

Background
Liberal Nationalism began as Tamir's doctoral thesis, under the direction of Isaiah Berlin.

Released by Princeton University Press, Liberal Nationalism was the first book by Tamir, an Israeli political scientist and former politician and activist. In the book, the author argued against globalisation, stating that nationalism still had a role to play and that it could complement liberalism.

References

External links
Book page at Princeton University Press

1993 non-fiction books
Political theories
Books about nationalism
American non-fiction books
Princeton University Press books